The 2008 Formula 3 Sudamericana season was the 22nd Formula 3 Sudamericana season. It began on 19 April 2008, at Autódromo Internacional de Curitiba and ended on 30 November at Autódromo José Carlos Pace in São Paulo. Brazilian driver Nelson Merlo won the title.

Drivers and teams
 All drivers competed in Pirelli-shod, Berta-powered Dallara F301s. All teams were Brazilian-registered.

Race calendar and results

Championship standings

References

External links
 Official website

Formula 3 Sudamericana
Sudamericana
Formula 3 Sudamericana seasons
Sudamericana F3